Mumbai–Pune Mail (started as Bombay–Poona Mail) or Poona Mail was a luxurious train on Mumbai–Pune section by the Great Indian Peninsula Railway. It was the first intercity train started between Mumbai and Pune. This train and the famous Deccan Queen Express used to serve Mumbai Pune commuters for many years. Started as Mail in 1863, it was 303 Poona Mail in 1964. Got extension to Miraj past GC as 303 Bombay Mail in 1971 & become 303 Mahalaxmi Express during 1974 with final extension to Kolhapur.
During Poona–Bangalore MG era, this connects 902 MG Poona Mail (Poona–Bangalore till 1971), 304 MG Bombay Mail (Miraj–Bangalore 1971–1974) & 304 MG Mahalaxmi Express (Miraj–Bangalore 1974 onwards till Miraj–Bangalore GC)  by Section Carriage Interchanged at Poona & later at Miraj.

Timetable 
It used to leave Pune at 7 am and Lonavala at 8:15 am and reach Mumbai by 11:10 am. The return train used to leave Mumbai at 2:45 pm and Lonavala at 5:55 pm and reach Pune by 7 pm. Later the departure time was changed to 5:55 pm from Mumbai.

Coaches and operation, 1907

Coaches 
In the year 1907 the train was operated with seven coaches with a total weight of 240 t. Seats for 50 first, 95 second and 320 third class passengers were provided. The restaurant car had another 32 seats. The train crew of 8 man included guard, conductor, car attendant, refreshment manager and waiters. The livery of the train was dark red-brown on the lower part and cream for the upper part.

The chairs could be turned around in order that the passengers were always looking in the travel direction. The cars had electric lighting powered by axle driven generators. 3rd class passengers did not have reserved seats. Punkah fans were provided only in 1st and 2nd class. The cars were fitted with vacuum brake and passenger alarm signal.

Train composition 
The train was composed in the following way:
 Locomotive
 Combination car with baggage compartment, guard compartment, 3rd class seating with compartments for Indian women and 3rd class refreshment bar   
 3rd class chair car
 2nd class car with chair seating as well as two compartments and a cloakroom
 Composite car containing 1st and 2nd chair class and 1st class compartments
 Dining car
 1st class parlor car with smoking room and ladies's boudoir
 Combination car with baggage, post office and guard facilities and 3rd class chair compartment for Europeans.

Traction 
The train was pulled by a 4-6-0 steam engine from Mumbai to the beginning of the 1:37-inclined Bhor Ghat mountain pass. At Karjat, the power was changed to two 0-4-0T engines, which brought the train up the Ghat.

See also

 Sister trains Mumbai–Pune:

 Sahyadri Express

References

Transport in Mumbai
Transport in Pune
Express trains in India
Rail transport in Maharashtra
Mumbai–Pune trains
Defunct trains in India